Heshan Bandara Unamboowe (born 19 May 1992) is a Sri Lankan swimmer who has represented his country at international competitions.  He was born in the town of Kandy to parents Dudley and Priyanga.  He received his primary and secondary education at Trinity College, Kandy. He started schooling in Dharmaraja College, Kandy and joined Trinity College in Grade 2. Unamboowe competed in the Men's 100m backstroke event at the 2012 Summer Olympics. He ranked 42nd and did not advance to the semifinals. He currently competes for Miami University in Ohio

References

External links
 

Sri Lankan male swimmers
Olympic swimmers of Sri Lanka
Alumni of Dharmaraja College
Alumni of Trinity College, Kandy
Sportspeople from Kandy
1992 births
Living people
Swimmers at the 2010 Summer Youth Olympics
Swimmers at the 2012 Summer Olympics
Swimmers at the 2006 Asian Games
Swimmers at the 2010 Asian Games
Commonwealth Games competitors for Sri Lanka
Swimmers at the 2014 Commonwealth Games
Asian Games competitors for Sri Lanka
South Asian Games gold medalists for Sri Lanka
South Asian Games silver medalists for Sri Lanka
South Asian Games bronze medalists for Sri Lanka
South Asian Games medalists in swimming
20th-century Sri Lankan people
21st-century Sri Lankan people